Lasiostega is a monotypic genus of moths in the family Epermeniidae. Its only species, Lasiostega siderina, was described by Edward Meyrick in 1932. It is found in India.

References

Epermeniidae
Moths described in 1932
Monotypic moth genera
Moths of Asia